Eyerusalem Dino Kelil (born 21 January 1992) is an Ethiopian racing cyclist, who last rode for UCI Women's Team .

Major results
Source: 

2013
 10th Time trial, African Road Championships
2015
 National Road Championships
1st  Time trial
1st  Road race
2016
 1st  Time trial, National Road Championships
2018
 African Road Championships
1st  Team time trial
10th Road race

See also
 List of 2015 UCI Women's Teams and riders

References

External links

1992 births
Living people
Ethiopian female cyclists
Place of birth missing (living people)
21st-century Ethiopian women